The Bawdy Adventures of Tom Jones is a 1976 British comedy film directed by Cliff Owen and starring Nicky Henson, Trevor Howard and Terry-Thomas. It is an adaptation of the 1749 novel Tom Jones by Henry Fielding, which follows the main character in a new series of misadventures.

Cast
 Nicky Henson as Tom Jones
 Trevor Howard as Squire Western
 Terry-Thomas as Mr. Square
 Arthur Lowe as Dr. Thwackum
 Georgia Brown as Jenny Jones
 Joan Collins as Black Bess
 William Mervyn as Squire Alworthy
 Murray Melvin as Blifil
 Madeline Smith as Sophia
 Geraldine McEwan as Lady Bellaston
 Jeremy Lloyd as Lord Fellamar
 Gladys Henson as Mrs Wilkins
 Maxine Casson as Prudence
 Joan Cooper as Nellie
 Isabel Dean as Bridget
 Arnold Diamond as Noisy Reveller
 Hilda Fenemore as Mrs. Belcher
 John Forrest as Captain Blifil
 James Hayter as Briggs
 Arthur Howard as Old Vicar
 Patricia McPherson as Molly Seagram
 Frank Thornton as Whitlow

See also
 Cinema of the United Kingdom

References

External links

1976 films
1970s historical comedy films
1970s English-language films
Films directed by Cliff Owen
British historical comedy films
Films shot at Pinewood Studios
Films based on British novels
Films based on works by Henry Fielding
Films set in the 18th century
Films scored by Ron Grainer
Films set in London
British sex comedy films
1970s sex comedy films
1970s British films